The Dead C are a New Zealand based music and art trio made up of members Bruce Russell, Michael Morley and Robbie Yeats. Russell plays electric guitar, Morley sings and plays electric guitar or laptop, and Yeats plays drums. They have been called one of the most interesting bands in the world by Thurston Moore, and have been cited as influences by Bardo Pond, Flying Saucer Attack, Labradford, and Pavement.

Overview 
Formed in Dunedin in 1987, the group is known for its lo-fi guitar soundscapes and improvisational take on rock music. Their first Auckland show was in 1989 at Russell Crowe's Venue, by which point they had already released two albums on Flying Nun, who Russell had been doing copywriting work for. They became known internationally through their releases on the Philadelphia record label Siltbreeze, especially the 1992 double LP Harsh 70s Reality. Early, pre-Siltbreeze albums such as Eusa Kills and DR503 found the group still drifting between song-based work and the experimental free rock found in later albums including The White House and Tusk. Recent albums have seen the group add electronics and samples, yet still maintaining their origins in trademark hazy guitar chaos. Their records are typically all improvised, and not recorded in a standard professional music studio.

The group performs infrequently outside of New Zealand, although they did travel to the US in March 2002 to perform at the All Tomorrow's Parties festival (curated by Sonic Youth), as well as a couple of gigs in Los Angeles and San Francisco. They also performed for the first time in Europe in May 2004 at Le Weekend, a new music festival in Stirling, Scotland and returned to the UK to play at the All Tomorrow's Parties festival again in December 2006. In 2008, they played a short tour in the United States, and returned to the UK to play All Tomorrow's Parties in December 2010. In September 2016, they played a few US dates including Cropped Out festival in Louisville, Kentucky

A compilation album covering their first 18 years entitled Vain Erudite and Stupid: Selected Works 1987-2005 was released on the Ba Da Bing label in 2006.

Discography

Albums

EPs

Cassettes

Compilations 

 Notes
  1500 copies made
  450 copies made

Singles

References

External links
 Archive of the Dead C. fansite with coverage of the fanzine era.
 [ Biography and Discography] at allmusic.com
 Michael Morley interview on MonsterFresh.com Aug. 2010

New Zealand indie rock groups
Flying Nun Records artists
New Zealand musical trios
Free improvisation ensembles
New Zealand experimental rock groups
Musicians from Dunedin
Musical groups established in 1986
1986 establishments in New Zealand
Siltbreeze Records artists